Sagdoidea is a superfamily of air-breathing land snails, terrestrial pulmonate gastropod mollusks in the infraorder Helicoidei  of the suborder Helicina.

Families
 Sagdidae Pilsbry, 1895
 Solaropsidae H. Nordsieck, 1986
 Zachrysiidae D. G. Robinson, Sei & Rosenberg, 2017

References

 Bouchet P., Rocroi J.P., Hausdorf B., Kaim A., Kano Y., Nützel A., Parkhaev P., Schrödl M. & Strong E.E. (2017). Revised classification, nomenclator and typification of gastropod and monoplacophoran families. Malacologia. 61(1-2): 1-526.

External links

Stylommatophora